Oshawa is an unincorporated community in Oshawa Township, Nicollet County, Minnesota, United States, near St. Peter.  The community is located along 450th Street near 417th Avenue and Nicollet County Road 13.

A post office called Oshawa was established in 1858, and remained in operation until it was discontinued in 1909. The community derives its name from Oshawa, in Ontario.

References

Unincorporated communities in Nicollet County, Minnesota
Unincorporated communities in Minnesota